is a Japanese football player for Veertien Mie.

Club statistics
Updated to 31 December 2020.

References

External links
Profile at Fukushima United FC

1991 births
Living people
Kokushikan University alumni
Association football people from Chiba Prefecture
Japanese footballers
J3 League players
Japan Football League players
Fukushima United FC players
Veertien Mie players
Association football midfielders